Hattencourt is a commune in the Somme department in Hauts-de-France in northern France.

Geography

History
The village was first mentioned in the 14th century.
It was razed to the ground by the troops of Henri de la Tour d'Auvergne, Vicomte de Turenne in 1636.As with many villages of the Somme, it was ruined by the bombardments of the First World War.

Population

See also
Communes of the Somme department

References

Communes of Somme (department)